Louis Darmanin (born 19 November 1908, date of death unknown) was a Maltese water polo player. He competed in the men's tournament at the 1928 Summer Olympics.

References

External links
 

1908 births
Year of death missing
Maltese male water polo players
Olympic water polo players of Malta
Water polo players at the 1928 Summer Olympics
Place of birth missing